Mekhak Ghazaryan (born December 13, 1966 in Gyumri, Shirak), also known as Mikhail Kazaryan, is a retired amateur boxer from Armenia. He represented the Soviet Union at the 1988 Summer Olympics in Seoul, South Korea in the men's featherweight (57 kg) division. Ghazaryan was defeated in the third round by eventual gold medalist Giovanni Parisi. He represented his native country at the 1996 Summer Olympics in Atlanta, Georgia in the men's lightweight (60 kg) division. Ghazaryan lost in the second round to Michael Strange.

Ghazaryan won the European Championship title in the lightweight division at the 1987 European Amateur Boxing Championships in Turin. Ghazaryan won a bronze medal at the 1993 European Amateur Boxing Championships in the lightweight division.

References

External links
 

1966 births
Living people
Sportspeople from Gyumri
Soviet male boxers
Soviet Armenians
Featherweight boxers
Lightweight boxers
Boxers at the 1988 Summer Olympics
Boxers at the 1996 Summer Olympics
Olympic boxers of Armenia
Olympic boxers of the Soviet Union
Armenian male boxers